The King Albert I Memorial, also named the King Albert I Monument is a memorial at the Belgian coastal city of Nieuwpoort. It is located right outside the old town, on the right bank of the Yser river at the lock complex Ganzepoot. The monument was erected in 1938 after a design of Julien de Ridder and honours both King Albert I of Belgium and the Belgian troops at the time of the First World War.

Description 
The circular monument is 25 metres tall and is 30 metres in diameter. It has ten columns, built out of bricks from the Yser plain. A prominent circular beam caps the structure. On this beam, there is a walkway with orientation tables. On the central square of the monument, there is an equestrian statue of King Albert I, designed by Karel Aubroeck.

Inauguration 
The building was inaugurated on 24 July 1938 in the presence of King Albert of Belgium's son King Leopold III, Elisabeth of Bavaria, Queen of Belgium, Prince Charles, Prince Baudouin, and Princess Josephine-Charlotte of Belgium. The whole complex is protected since 1999 as a monument.

Nieuport Memorial 
A monument for the British troops, the Nieuport Memorial, was erected on the square in front of the Albert Memorial. It consists of a commemorative column and commemorates the names of 566 British officers and soldiers who died during the battles at the Belgian coast during the First World War, particularly in 1917.

Westfront Nieuwpoort 
The memorial was restored and expanded, before the reopening and renaming on 18 October 2014. The renewed Westfront Nieuwpoort was visited by heads of state and government on 28 October, including Belgian King Philippe and German chancellor Angela Merkel. The visitors' centre was designed by the Antwerp architects' workshop (Antwerps Architecten Atelier). A permanent exhibition illustrates the inundation of the Yser plain in 1914 by opening the sluices at the Ganzepoot. The monumental panoramic painting "Panorama of the Battle of the Yser in October 1914" by Alfred Bastien is shown in a downsized, digitised format. The original dimensions are 115 metres by 14 metres.

References

External links 
 Description of the building on the website of the Flemish inventory of immovable heritage
 Information about the monument on a tourist website about the Great War in the Westhoek
 Information about the Westfront Nieuwpoort visitors' centre on the official tourism website of Nieuwpoort

World War I memorials in Belgium
Buildings and structures completed in 1938